The Ainsty or the Ainsty of York was a historic district of Yorkshire, England, west of the city of York. Originally a wapentake or subdivision of the West Riding of Yorkshire it later had a unique status as a rural area controlled by the corporation of the city.

Geography
The Ainsty covered an area to the west of York, bounded by three rivers: the Nidd to the north; the Ouse to the east and the Wharfe to the south. The Ainsty was unique among the wapentakes of Yorkshire in that it was not formally included in any Ridings from 1449 until 1836.

The Ainsty is now divided between the City of York, the Borough of Harrogate and Selby District, all in North Yorkshire.

Early history
The Ainsty is first recorded in the Domesday Book of 1086 (in the form Ainestig), when it was a wapentake of the West Riding of Yorkshire.  It was named from Ainsty Cliff at Bilbrough,  presumably the original meeting place of the wapentake.  Ainsty Cliff was itself named from a small narrow path which led from Steeton Farm over Ainsty Cliff to Bilbrough.  The word Ainsty is from Old English ān stiga, meaning "one-man path" or "narrow path", which became einstigi in Old Norse.

The city of York later claimed jurisdiction over the area under a royal charter of King John granted in the early 13th century. The validity of this charter was a matter of dispute between the city and the Crown, eventually leading to the imprisonment of the mayor in 1280 when it was proved that a clause in the document had been altered. The bailiffs of the city were subsequently able to resume jurisdiction of the wapentake, although it was not formally included in the city when it was created a county of itself in 1396.

In 1449 the Ainsty was annexed to York, with the sheriffs of the city assuming authority. The city, which was said to be "in decay", was granted the "privileges and franchises" of the Ainsty to improve its financial position. In 1463 the mayor and aldermen were made justices of the peace with the commission of oyer and terminer.

Municipal reform
The Municipal Corporations Act 1835 reformed the city of York as a municipal borough with effect from 1 January 1836. It was unclear if the reformed corporation still had jurisdiction in the Ainsty. The matter was finally settled by the Municipal Corporation (Boundaries) Act 1836, which came into force in August. Under the legislation the Ainsty was declared to be part of the West Riding for all purposes. When elected county councils were created by the Local Government Act 1888, the Ainsty's inclusion in the West Riding was confirmed.

By the 19th-century, the Ainsty had two divisions: the eastern, or York Division, and the western, or Tadcaster Division.

Like other similar subdivisions of counties, although the Ainsty was never formally abolished, it ceased to have any function in the latter half of the 19th century. The former area of the wapentake is now divided between the unitary City of York and the districts of Harrogate and Selby in North Yorkshire.

Constituent parishes and townships
From 1866 the wapentake comprised the following civil parishes:

Legacy
The Ainsty gives its name to the Selby and Ainsty parliamentary constituency, first contested at the general election of 2010, and the New Ainsty Deanery of the Church of England.

The Ainsty Bounds Walk is a  footpath around Ainsty.

Ainsty is also the name of a residential area of Wetherby developed in the 1950s, including Ainsty Road, Ainsty Crescent, Ainsty Drive and Ainsty View.

The Ainsty is the name of a public house in the Acomb area of York.

Ainsty also gives its name to Ainsty Court inside Halifax College, a college within the University of York.

References

External links
Ainsty Wapentake at visionofbritain.org.uk

Ancient subdivisions of Yorkshire
History of York
Wapentakes of the West Riding of Yorkshire